Sodium orthophenyl phenol is a compound used as a disinfectant. It is the sodium salt of 2-phenylphenol.

As a food additive, it has E number E232.

References

Phenols
Organic sodium salts